Holley Fain (born August 28, 1981) is an American actress, known for her roles as Dr. Julia Canner on the ABC medical drama series Grey's Anatomy, and Maureen van der Bilt on The CW's teen drama Gossip Girl. She is also known for portraying Daphne Stillington and Ruth Kelly in the Broadway productions of Present Laughter and Harvey, respectively.

Career
After graduating in acting from the University of Illinois at Urbana-Champaign, Fain debuted on the Broadway stage in 2010 in Roundabout Theatre Company's revival of Present Laughter. On television, she is known for her role as Maureen van der Bilt on Gossip Girl and as Dr. Julia Canner on Grey's Anatomy.

Fain has also appeared on television series such as 3 lbs, Lipstick Jungle, Law & Order: Criminal Intent, The Good Wife, Memphis Beat and The Mentalist. Her film credits include Blinders, One Night and Forgetting the Girl. In 2015, she was cast in the pilot episode of ABC's crime drama series Wicked City, portraying the role of Trish Roth.

Filmography

Stage

References

External links

 
 

1981 births
American film actresses
American stage actresses
American television actresses
Actresses from Kansas
Living people
People from Leawood, Kansas
21st-century American women